Kiril Dimitrov Yanchulev (19 February 1896 – April 1961) was a Bulgarian officer and Chief of Staff of the Bulgarian Army from 6 to 13 September 1944.

Biography 

Kiril Yanchulev was born in Prilep, in the Manastir Vilayet of the Ottoman Empire (present-day North Macedonia). His father was a prominent Bulgarian revival figure Dimitar Yanchulev, his mother Evgenia Yanchuleva was a teacher. He studied at the Bulgarian Men's High School of Thessaloniki. After he graduated the Military School in Sofia on 12 March 1916, was assigned as lieutenant and took part in World War I.

After the war, Yanchulev specialized in the French Military Academy at St. Cyr. In January 1923 he was promoted to Captain. During 1928–1929 Yanchulev lectures military history at the Military School in Sofia. On 15 May 1930 he was promoted to Major, and on 26 August 1934 in the rank of Colonel. In 1931 released his book The Russo-Turkish War of 1877–1878.

Between 1934 and 1939 Yanchulev was a military attaché in Paris and London.

On 3 October 1938 he was promoted to Colonel and in the same year was appointed  as chief of the Military Academy. In August, he was appointed Head of the army headquarters. In March 1942 he served as Assistant Chief of Staff of the army and on 6 May 1943 he was promoted to Major General.

Yanchulev was appointed as Chief of Staff of the Bulgarian Army on 6 September 1944 but dismissed just a week later.

After World War II Yanchulev was persecuted by the communist authorities and imprisoned in the concentration camp Belene.

General Kiril Yanchulev died in April 1961.

Footnotes

1896 births
1961 deaths
People from Prilep
People from Manastir vilayet
Bulgarian military personnel of World War I
Bulgarian military personnel of World War II
Bulgarian generals
Macedonian Bulgarians
Recipients of the Order of Bravery
Officiers of the Légion d'honneur
Bulgarian Men's High School of Thessaloniki alumni